Kržišče pri Čatežu is a small settlement in the Municipality of Litija in central Slovenia. It lies just north of Čatež. The area is part of the traditional region of Lower Carniola. It is now included with the rest of the municipality in the Central Sava Statistical Region.

Name
The name of the settlement was changed from Kržišče to Kržišče pri Čatežu in 1955.

References

External links
Kržišče pri Čatežu on Geopedia

Populated places in the Municipality of Litija